Aristaeus may refer to:

 Aristaeus, a Greek god
 Aristaeus the Elder, Greek mathematician, active in the 4th century BCE
 Aristaeus, another name for Battus I of Cyrene, founder of the colony of Cyrene
 2135 Aristaeus, an Apollo asteroid
 Aristaeus, one of the Giants in Greek mythology